Linda Karen Reynolds  (born 16 May 1965) is an Australian politician. She is a member of the Liberal Party and has served as a Senator for Western Australia since 2014. She held senior ministerial office as a cabinet minister in the Morrison government from 2019 to 2022.

Before entering parliament Reynolds was a member of the Australian Army Reserve for nearly 30 years and was the first woman in the reserve to attain the rank of brigadier. She was initially elected to the Senate at the 2013 federal election, but the result was voided and she was re-elected at a supplementary election in 2014. In the Morrison government she served as Assistant Minister for Home Affairs (2018–2019), Minister for Defence Industry (2019), Minister for Emergency Management and North Queensland Recovery (2019), Minister for Defence (2019–2021), and Minister for Government Services and the National Disability Insurance Scheme (2021–2022).

Early life and education
Reynolds was born in Perth on 16 May 1965. She is the daughter of Laith and Jan Reynolds and has two brothers; she has said she was raised with "strong Christian values". Her grandfather Alfred Reynolds served in the Parliament of Western Australia as a member of the Australian Labor Party (ALP). Her maternal grandparents were English immigrants.

Reynolds grew up in the suburb of Gooseberry Hill and attended St Brigid's College. During her childhood she lived in Indonesia for a period where her father was a manager for Philips. The family learned to speak Indonesian and her mother took a degree in Indonesian studies.

Reynolds holds the degree of Bachelor of Commerce from Curtin University and also holds graduate certificates in training and development (Southern Cross University), defence management (University of Canberra) and strategic studies (Australian Defence College).

Military career
Reynolds enlisted in the Australian Army Reserve in 1984, aged 19. She served variously as an officer cadet, regional logistics officer, training development officer, military instructor at the Army Command and Staff College, commanding officer of the 5th Combat Service Support Battalion, director of the Active Standby Staff Group, project director at the Canberra Deep Space Communications Complex, strategy development director of Raytheon Australia, director of the Accountability Model Implementation Project, and director of the Army Strategic Reform Program. She was adjutant general of the Army Reserve from 2012 to 2013. She was awarded the Conspicuous Service Cross in the 2011 Australia Day Honours for "outstanding achievement as the Director of Army Strategic Reform Program coordination". On attaining the rank of brigadier in 2012, Reynolds became the first woman in the Australian Army Reserve to be promoted to a star rank.

Early political involvement

Reynolds joined the Liberal Party in 1987. Prior to her election to parliament, she held various positions in the party's organisational wing. She was a campaign manager for the divisions of Pearce and Hasluck and served as a deputy federal director from 2006 to 2008. She also worked as an electorate officer and ministerial advisor, notably as chief of staff and senior adviser to justice minister Chris Ellison from 2001 to 2003. Prior to 2014, she had mentored political leaders from Thailand, Papua New Guinea, Iraq, Afghanistan and Pakistan.

Senate (2014–2023)
Reynolds was elected to the Senate at the 2013 federal election from third position on the Liberal Party's ticket in Western Australia. However, her position was placed in doubt when the High Court ordered a fresh half-Senate election after determining that there were missing ballot papers. Reynolds was successful in the re-run and her Senate term commenced on 1 July 2014. She was subsequently re-elected to the Senate at the 2016 federal election and the 2019 federal election, leading the Liberal Party's ticket in the latter. She chaired a number of Senate committees prior to her elevation to the ministry in 2018.

Reynolds is a member of the Moderate/Modern Liberal faction of the Liberal Party.

During the 2018 Liberal Party of Australia leadership spills, Reynolds reportedly supported the incumbent prime minister Malcolm Turnbull in the first ballot on 21 August before switching her support to Scott Morrison in the second ballot on 24 August. On 23 August, she told the Senate that she was "distressed and disturbed" by the behaviour of some Liberal MPs during the leadership conflict, which had "no place in my party or this chamber".

Government minister

In August 2018, Reynolds was appointed Assistant Minister for Home Affairs in the First Morrison Ministry, serving under Peter Dutton. She was elevated to Cabinet in March 2019 as Minister for Defence Industry, as part of a planned transition to the role of Minister for Defence following Christopher Pyne's decision to retire at the 2019 federal election. She was also appointed to the new role of Minister for Emergency Management and North Queensland Recovery, having previously held responsibility for disaster recovery in the Assistant Minister for Home Affairs position. In early 2019, she was a strong opponent of the medevac bill that expanded the medical evacuation of asylum seekers from offshore processing facilities to Australia. In a speech to the Senate, she said that the bill would encourage unauthorised arrivals by boat and that as a result the military would "have to recover the bloated corpses of babies and women mauled by sharks".

Reynolds was appointed Minister for Defence in May 2019, following the Coalition's victory at the 2019 federal election, the second woman to hold the position after Marise Payne. Her appointment was cautiously welcomed by Neil James, the president of the Australian Defence Association, who noted her lack of ministerial experience. In May 2020, Reynolds was accused of misleading the Senate by Mark Sullivan, the chair of the Defence Honours and Awards Appeal Tribunal, over her rejection of a posthumous Victoria Cross for Australia for Teddy Sheean.

In March 2021, Reynolds was demoted to Minister for Government Services and Minister for the National Disability Insurance Scheme.

Alleged rape

In February 2021, reports emerged that Brittany Higgins, a junior staffer, had allegedly been raped in 2019 by Bruce Lehrmann, an advisor to Reynolds, in her office late at night. Reynolds faced pressure to reveal what she had known about the alleged incident. The advisor was sacked days after the alleged incident for a security breach. Reynolds did not provide a reference but did not say whether his termination payout was withheld. Prime Minister Scott Morrison publicly rebuked Reynolds for not telling him of the alleged incident. Reynolds was due to address the National Press Club on 24 February, but it was announced that day that she had taken indefinite medical leave related to a pre-existing condition. Her medical leave was extended on 7 March for another four weeks to 2 April.

In March 2021, it was reported that Reynolds had called the above-mentioned junior member of parliamentary staff a "lying cow" in the presence of her own staff at Parliament House Canberra. Lawyers representing the junior staff member demanded a public apology. Reynolds issued an apology for the comment, saying the comments were not over the rape allegation.

In December 2022, the case was dropped by the Director of Public Prosecutions stating it was "no longer in the public interest to pursue a prosecution at the risk of [Higgins'] life". The accused "consistently maintained his innocence and the case against him was not proven".

In January 2023, Reynolds stated she would be suing Higgins’ partner David Sharaz for defamation.

References

External links

 Summary of parliamentary voting for Senator Linda Reynolds on TheyVoteForYou.org.au

1965 births
21st-century Australian politicians
21st-century Australian women politicians
Australian brigadiers
Curtin University alumni
Liberal Party of Australia members of the Parliament of Australia
Living people
Members of the Australian Senate for Western Australia
Recipients of the Conspicuous Service Cross (Australia)
Southern Cross University alumni
University of Canberra alumni
Women members of the Australian Senate
Women in the Australian military
Women government ministers of Australia
Morrison Government
Military personnel from Western Australia
Female defence ministers
Defence ministers of Australia